The Infernal Rapist (Spanish: El violador infernal) is a 1988 Mexican horror and thriller film directed by Damián Acosta Esparza. The film stars Noé Murayama, Princesa Lea, Ana Luisa Peluffo, Marisol Cervantes, Manuel 'Flaco' Ibáñez and Fidel Abregoin.

Plot
Notorious serial rapist Carlos "El Gato" is condemened to death by electric chair. Upon his execution he is offered a deal by Satan who appears in the form of a seductive woman. Satan promises him all the drugs and wealth imaginable in exchange for raping and murdering men and women in her name.

Cast
 Noé Murayama
 Princesa Lea
 Ana Luisa Peluffo
 Marisol Cervantes
 Manuel 'Flaco' Ibáñez
 Fidel Abrego
 Luis Avendaño
 Ramón Gaona

Home media 
The film was restored in 4K resolution from its 35mm original camera negative and released on Blu-ray by Vinegar Syndrome in 2023.

References

External links
 

1988 films
Mexican horror thriller films
1980s Spanish-language films
1988 horror films
1980s horror thriller films
Mexican slasher films
1980s slasher films
1980s Mexican films